Panocha mani (also spelled as panutsa mani), or simply panutsa or samani, is a Filipino brittle confection made with muscovado sugar or sangkaka (native jaggery), whole peanuts, and butter (or margarine). It can also be made with whole pili nuts. It is similar to bagkat, another Filipino confection made from ground roasted or fried nuts and sugar, but the latter has a chewy texture. It is also sometimes called piñato mani, piñato de Cebu, or simply piñato in the Visayas Islands (not to be confused with piñato de pinipig from Samar, which is a similar snack made with crispy pinipig rice and peanuts).

See also

 Pinasugbo
 Caycay
 Panocha

References

External links

Philippine cuisine
Peanut dishes
Nut confections